The Battle of Cassano was fought in the Autumn of 1259 between Guelph and Ghibelline armies in Northern Italy.

In 1259, Ezzelino da Romano and his Ghibelline army moved into Lombardy and besieged Orci Novi. However, the approach of the Guelph army forced Ezzelino to abandon the siege and cross the Oglio River. Joined by exiled nobles from Milan, the Ghibellines attempted to take the city of Monza by force but failed. Ezzelino and his troops, aware of their now-dangerous position, retreated to the Adda River.

Here, Ezzelino and his troops were defeated by the Guelphs under Azzo VII d'Este. Ezzelino was wounded and captured, and imprisoned at Soncino, where he died of his wounds a few days later.

In Soncino, a weekly bell ring recalls Ezzelino III da Romano's death. Legend has it that he was buried with his treasure.

Sources 

Cassano 1259
Cassano 1259
1259 in Europe
1250s in the Holy Roman Empire
13th century in Italy
Cassano 1259
Cassano